Comfort and Indifference is a 1982 documentary film by Denys Arcand, offering an analysis of the 1980 Quebec referendum, in which "sovereignty-association" was defeated as a first step to eventual secession from Canada. The film takes the position that the referendum result was a failure of courage and that the Québécois were numbed by prosperity and the explicitly Machiavellian manipulations of federalist leaders.

Production
The film had a budget of $483,675 (.

Works cited

External links
NFB Web page
Watch Le confort et l'indifférence online (in French)

1982 films
Canadian documentary films
National Film Board of Canada documentaries
Films directed by Denys Arcand
Documentary films about Quebec politics
1982 documentary films
French-language Canadian films
1980s Canadian films